The Chiosura is a small coastal stream in the department of Haute-Corse, Corsica, France.
It enters the Tyrrhenian Sea from the east of the island.

Course

It rises to the south of the  Pointe de Campana and to the north of the  Pointe de Mufuncello. 
It flows southeast past the village of Linguizzetta, passes under the T10 coastal highway, then turns north and flows through wet meadows (Marais de Chiosura) behind the beach before cutting across the beach to the sea.

Wetland

The land around the lower part of the Chiosura, known as the Marais de Giustignana, has been classified as a Zone naturelle d'intérêt écologique, faunistique et floristique (ZNIEFF).
It extends along the river on both sides of the T10 coastal highway, and along its Campo Vecchio and Bottari tributaries.
The wetland occupies a depression in the coastal plain.
There are a few wet meadows to the east of the coastal road.
The Chiosura drains the marsh, then runs for about  through a reed bed along a degraded sandy lido (coastal dunes) before entering the sea.

Tributaries

The following streams (ruisseaux) are tributaries of the Chiosura (ordered by length) and sub-tributaries:
 Campo Vecchio: 
 Bottari: 
 Farinaccio: 
 Sculimerda:

Notes

Sources

 

Rivers of Haute-Corse
Rivers of France
Coastal basins of the Tyrrhenian Sea in Corsica